Laphria is a genus described by Johann Wilhelm Meigen in 1803, belonging to the family Asilidae, subfamily Laphriinae. Members of this genus are known as bee-like robber flies. This genus has a Holarctic distribution, occurring in Europe, Asia, and North America. They prey on a variety of insects, including other robber flies, bees, wasps and beetles. Like other asilids, they use their proboscis to penetrate the body of their prey and inject enzymes which dissolve the tissues. 

These large flies measure  in length. Most Laphria species are quite hairy and black in color. Some have bee-mimicking markings with black and yellow stripes (like Laphria thoracica). They can be encountered from July through September.

Species

Select species include:

Laphria affinis Macquart, 1855
Laphria aktis Mcatee, 1919
Laphria altitudinum Bromley, 1924
Laphria apila (Bromley, 1951)
Laphria aurea (Fabricius, 1794)
Laphria canis Williston, 1883
Laphria ephippium (Fabricius, 1781)
Laphria fernaldi (Back, 1904)
Laphria flava (Linnaeus, 1761)
Laphria flavescens Macquart, 1838
Laphria flavicollis Say, 1824
Laphria gilva (Linnaeus, 1758)
Laphria ithypyga Mcatee, 1919
Laphria ivorina Oldroyd, 1968
Laphria kistjakovskiji Paramonov, 1929
Laphria sadales Walker, 1849
Laphria saffrana Fabricius, 1805
Laphria sapporensis Matsumura, 1911
Laphria thoracica Fabricius, 1805
Laphria tibialis Meigen, 1820
Laphria venezuelensis Macquart, 1846
Laphria ventralis Williston, 1885
Laphria violacea Macquart, 1846
Laphria vulpina Meigen, 1820
Laphria xanthothrix Hermann, 1914
Laphria yamatonis Matsumura, 1916

References

External links 
 W. L. Mcatee - Key to the Nearctic Species of the genus Laphria (Diptera, Asilidae) - Kb.osu.edu
 Stephen W. Bullington, Ph.D. - The Laphriini Pages
 Herschel Raney - Laphria of Arkansas

 
Asilidae genera
Taxa named by Johann Wilhelm Meigen
Diptera of Asia